The Bény-sur-Mer Canadian War Cemetery is a cemetery containing predominantly Canadian soldiers killed during the early stages of the Battle of Normandy in the Second World War. It is located in and named after Bény-sur-Mer in the Calvados department, near Caen in lower Normandy.  As is typical of war cemeteries in France, the grounds are beautifully landscaped and immaculately kept. Contained within the cemetery is a Cross of Sacrifice, a piece of architecture typical of memorials designed by the Commonwealth War Graves Commission.

Canadian soldiers killed later in the Battle of Normandy are buried south east of Caen in the Bretteville-sur-Laize Canadian War Cemetery located in Cintheaux.

History
Bény-sur-Mer was created as a permanent resting place for Canadian soldiers who had been temporarily interred in smaller plots close to where they fell. As is usual for war cemeteries or monuments, France granted Canada a perpetual concession to the land occupied by the cemetery. The graves contain soldiers from the 3rd Canadian Division and 15 airmen killed during the Battle of Normandy.

The cemetery also includes three British graves and one French grave, for a total of 2048 markers. The French grave belongs to a French resistance soldier named R. Guenard who fought and died alongside the Canadians and who had no known relatives. His marker is the grey cross visible in the lower left of the panoramic view below and is inscribed "Mort pour la France – 19-7-1944".

Because of confusion during the movement of remains from temporary cemeteries, the remains of one Canadian soldier were misplaced; his tombstone is set apart from the others, and bears an inscription stating that it is known that his remains are in the Bény-sur-Mer cemetery. Bény-sur-Mer contains the remains of nine sets of brothers.

A large number of dead in the cemetery were killed in early July 1944 in the Battle for Caen. The cemetery also contains soldiers who fell during the initial D-Day assault of Juno Beach. Some of the Canadian Prisoners of War illegally executed at the Ardenne Abbey are interred here. It also contains the grave of the Reverend (Honorary Captain) Walter Leslie Brown, chaplain to the 27th Armoured Regiment (Sherbrooke Fusiliers) and the only chaplain killed in cold blood during the Second World War. Rev Brown was murdered on the night of June 6/7 by members of III/25th SS Panzer Grenedier Regt near Galmanche, but his body was not found until July 1944. Canadians killed later in the campaign were interred in the Bretteville-sur-Laize Canadian War Cemetery.

The site was featured in Leg 7 of The Amazing Race Canadas second season, where contestants arrived at the cemetery and paid their respects before retrieving their clue along with a LEST WE FORGET Card.

Location
The cemetery is about one kilometre east of the village of Reviers, in the Calvados department, on the Creully-Tailleville-Ouistreham road (D.35). It is located 15 kilometres northwest of Caen, 18 kilometres east of Bayeux, an three and a half kilometres south of Courseulles-sur-Mer. The village of Bény-sur-Mer is some two kilometres southeast of the cemetery. The cemetery can be accessed any time.

Additional Images

See also 
 List of military cemeteries in Normandy
 Canadian war cemeteries

References
 Veterans Affairs Canada

External links
 
 

Canadian military memorials and cemeteries
Commonwealth War Graves Commission cemeteries in France
Military history of Canada during World War II
Operation Neptune
Operation Overlord cemeteries